Luísa Gerloff Sonza (born 18 July 1998) is a Brazilian singer-songwriter. In 2014, she gained fame on YouTube singing cover songs, then in 2017 she released her first major label song, "Good Vibes". A dozen of Sonza's songs were major hits in Brazil, and in Mexico she charted with "Friend de Semana" (2020), a collaboration with Danna Paola and Aitana. Sonza was featured on a remix of Katy Perry's "Cry About It Later" which charted in New Zealand in 2021.

Sonza has appeared as an actress on several television episodes, and with Pabllo Vittar she co-hosts the HBO Max show Queen Stars.

Career
Sonza began singing at a Gaucho folklore community centre in her hometown at the age of seven. She was hired as a child singer by music group Sol Maior, staying with them for 10 years. Sonza would appear in a total of up to 24 concerts a month, with approximately 5,000 attending each time. In 2014, she launched a cover song YouTube channel, which made her gain online visibility. She became known then as 'Queen of Covers'.

Sonza signed with Universal Music in May 2017, with her first single, Good Vibes, being then released. In July, she released her second single, Olhos Castanhos (Brown Eyes), a song she wrote for then-husband Whindersson Nunes. In October the same year, she released her first, self-titled EP with track Não Preciso de Você Pra Nada (There Is Nothing I Need You For) featuring Brazilian singer Luan Santana.

In January 2018, Sonza released the song Rebolar (Twerking) from her first EP as a single. The video peaked 1st on YouTube. In March, Rebolar (Remix) with 5 remix tracks of the song was released as an EP.

In June 2018, Sonza made a special guest appearance in an episode of Brazilian TV sitcom Dra. Darci (Dr Darci), in which she played Julinha. In July, she released Devagarinho (Step by Step), which made it to Spotify's Brazil Top 50 chart.

In October 2018, Sonza was invited by soap opera writer Aguinaldo Silva to record Nunca Foi Sorte (It Was Never by Chance), a song written by Silva, for the soundtrack of TV Globo's telenovela O Sétimo Guardião. She also made a special guest appearance in one of the episodes. Later that year, Sonza released the song as a single and music video.

In November 2018, Sonza released the single Boa menina (Good Girl). In February 2019, a forró version of the song was used in a video featuring Whindersson Nunes. In March 2019, she released Pior Que Possa Imaginar (Worse Than You Can Imagine). Later that year, Sonza released her first album, Pandora.

In June 2020, Sonza gave a performance in the online version of the NYC Pride March.

Personal life
In August 2016, YouTuber Whindersson Nunes asked Luisa to be his girlfriend. In March 2017, they got engaged. In February 2018, they married in a civil and religious ceremony for 350 guests in Alagoas, Brazil.

On 29 April 2020, through a post on Instagram, Whinderson announced his divorce, claiming that Luisa and he had grown apart but remain good friends.

In an interview, Sonza said she is too conscious of her own body to have biological children, and intends to adopt instead.

Sonza is openly bisexual.

Views on women's empowerment and toxic masculinity

Sonza received criticism alleging she had married for money and responded by saying she made as much money as her former husband Whindersson Nunes did. She once thought being a victim of machismo was a woman's fault, but realised no matter what she did, she would be a victim anyway. 'I had two options: either understand a sick social structure, or become sick myself'; 'They're using the structure to talk about women, to place them in an undeserving position, of being less smart, and incomplete without a man—just like they did to my mum, my grandma, my aunt', she said. She holds no hard feelings towards trolls harassing her online. 'Before deconstructing other people, I have to deconstruct myself'. As to marriage, Sonza states: 'It is not women's duty to do anything, or be anything. It is not our duty to be a mother, or get married. Unless you want to, I'm against women letting go of their dreams to fulfil someone else's dreams.'

In September 2020, after protests by Anitta and Sonza, Oxford Languages decided to reassess the definitions of Portuguese words patroa ('owner' or 'boss', in the feminine gender), professora ('teacher', in the feminine gender) and mulher solteira ('single woman') appearing in Google's definitional search, which until then were related to misogynistic definitions such as 'housewife' (patroa) and 'prostitute' (professora and mulher solteira). Both Google and Oxford Languages issued press releases stating that they would either revise the definitions or remove the item if it 'no longer reflected the modern usage of Portuguese language by Brazilian speakers.'

Discography

Studio albums

Extended plays

Singles

As lead artist

Filmography

Television

Awards and nominations

Notes

References

External links 

 
 
 Luísa Sonza on Spotify
 

1998 births
Living people
People from Rio Grande do Sul
Brazilian people of German descent
Brazilian people of Italian descent
Brazilian women composers
Brazilian women singer-songwriters
Brazilian singer-songwriters
21st-century Brazilian singers
21st-century Brazilian women singers
Latin music songwriters
Women in Latin music
Bisexual musicians
Brazilian LGBT singers
LGBT people in Latin music
Bisexual women
21st-century Brazilian LGBT people